A number of deaf people have competed in the modern Olympic Games, with the earliest known being Carlo Orlandi, an Italian boxer who competed in the 1928 Olympics in Amsterdam.

In some cases, adaptations have been made to accommodate deaf athletes. 

(There is also a specific event for the deaf, the Deaflympics, organized by the International Committee of Sports for the Deaf. This is also held every four years, and some of the people listed in this article will have also competed there).

Summer games

Athletes
The table below shows Deaf athletes known to have competed in the Olympics. All either competed at the Deaflympics, or would have qualified to do so. To qualify for the Deaflympics, "athletes must have a hearing loss of at least 55db in their 'better ear'. Hearing aids, cochlear implants and the like are not allowed to be used in competition, to place all athletes on the same level"  In the Olympics, there is no restriction on hearing loss or use of hearing aids.

Opening ceremony

See also
Deaf people in the Commonwealth Games

References

 Olympics
Lists of Olympic competitors

Olympics